Suileng County is a county of west-central Heilongjiang province, People's Republic of China. It is under the jurisdiction of the prefecture-level city of Suihua, and contains its northernmost point.

Administrative divisions 
Suileng County is divided into 4 subdistricts, 6 towns and 5 townships. 
4 subdistricts
 Chezhan, Jianshe, Xibei, Dongnan
6 towns
 Suileng, Shangji, Sihaidian, Shuangchahe, Geshan, Changshan
5 townships
 Kaoshan, Houtou, Keyinhe, Suizhong, Ni'erhe

Demographics 

Climate

External links
  Government Site -

Notes and references

Suileng
Suihua